Teppo is a male Finnish name, that originated as a diminutive of the name Tapani.

It is quite an uncommon first name, and is derived from Stefanos, a Greek name which means roughly translated "laurel" or "crowned" or "crown". The name made its way through the Russian name Stefan (nickname Stepan, or Stjopa) to Carelian Stjoppi, from where it came to the Finnish version - Teppo. However, some claim the name's origin is the Greek name Teofilus (God's friend) or Teodor (God's gift).

In Finland, Teppo was the name of a pagan god "Travel-Teppo", who was prayed to guide the way and bless travels. In the 19th century, it began to be used as a normal first name. Most popular time for the name Teppo was years 1960–1980. In 2005, 3841 men had been given the name Teppo.

Teppo can also be a last name, but it is quite rare.

People named Teppo
Teppo Hauta-Aho, double bassist and composer
Teppo Felin, professor at Oxford University
Teppo Numminen, professional hockey defenceman
Teppo Rastio, retired professional ice hockey player
Teppo Turkki, writer and researcher

As a surname
, singer-songwriter

Finnish masculine given names
Finnish-language surnames